Ryan Oliver Sampson is an English actor, best known for playing Alex Venables in After You've Gone, Grumio in Plebs, and Tommo in  Brassic. He also played Luke Rattigan in the Series 4 two-part story of Doctor Who, "The Sontaran Stratagem" and "The Poison Sky".

Early life
Sampson was born in Rotherham, South Yorkshire. He went to Anston Brook primary school and then on to Wales High School in Kiveton Park, where he appeared in school productions such as The Little Shop of Horrors.

Career
Sampson began his career at Sheffield's Crucible Theatre. Prior to After You've Gone, he appeared in Wire in the Blood, in 2003, In Denial of Murder, Heartbeat and Holby City in 2006. He appeared in the BBC Three pilot The Things I Haven't Told You and had a role in two episodes of the 2008 series of Doctor Who, playing the young American genius Luke Rattigan in "The Sontaran Stratagem" and "The Poison Sky". In 2008 he worked at the National Theatre. In 2011 he played a small part in Channel 4 comedy series Fresh Meat. In 2015 he played various characters in the ITV2 sketch show Glitchy. In 2015 he also appeared as Charles 'Boz' Dickens in ITV Encore's The Frankenstein Chronicles. Sampson currently portrays Tommo in Sky One's 2019 British sitcom Brassic. Sampson's acting influence is Tom Hanks.

Personal life 
Sampson confirmed that he is gay via Twitter on 20 February 2019, publishing a photo of himself with his boyfriend.

Filmography

Film

Television

Theatre

References

External links 

 

Year of birth missing (living people)
Living people
English male television actors
English male stage actors
English male child actors
Actors from Rotherham
Male actors from Yorkshire
English male Shakespearean actors
English gay actors
People educated at Wales High School
English LGBT actors